The 2017 Girls' U16 European Volleyball Championship was the inaugural edition of the Girls' U16 European Volleyball Championship, a biennial international volleyball tournament organised by the European Volleyball Confederation (CEV) the girls' under-16 national teams of Europe. The tournament was held in Bulgaria from 21 to 29 July 2017.

Qualification

Venues

Preliminary round

Pool I

|}

|}

Pool II

|}

|}

5th–8th classification

5th–8th semifinals

|}

7th-place match

|}

5th-place match

|}

Final round

Semifinals

|}

3rd-place match

|}

Final

|}

Final standing

Awards
At the conclusion of the tournament, the following players were selected as the tournament dream team.

Most Valuable Player
  Tatiana Kadochkina
Best Setter
  Sofia Monza
Best Outside Spikers
  Aleksandra Georgieva
  Kseniya Liabiodkina

Best Middle Blockers
  Claudia Consoli
  Elizaveta Kochurina
Best Opposite Spiker
  Merilin Nikolova
Best Libero
  Francesca Magazza

References

External links
Official website

Girls' Youth European Volleyball Championship
Europe
Volleyball
International volleyball competitions hosted by Bulgaria
Volleyball European Championship (girls)
2017 in Bulgarian women's sport